The Agricultural Development Bank of Trinidad and Tobago is a financial institution committed to encouraging the growth of the agri-sector of that country and the Caribbean as a whole.

External links
 Agricultural Development Bank of Trinidad and Tobago

Banks of Trinidad and Tobago